New Eucha is a census-designated place (CDP) in Delaware County, Oklahoma, United States. The population was 405 at the 2010 census, up from the figure of 300 recorded in 2000.

Geography
New Eucha is located in central Delaware County at  (36.403148, -94.872541). It is bordered to its northeast by the city of Jay, the county seat. The original community of Eucha occupies a corner of land at the western edge of the CDP.

Demographics

As of the census of 2000, there were 300 people, 112 households, and 82 families residing in the CDP. The population density was 39.5 people per square mile (15.2/km2). There were 128 housing units at an average density of 16.8/sq mi (6.5/km2). The racial makeup of the CDP was 49.67% White, 41.67% Native American, and 8.67% from two or more races.

There were 112 households, out of which 38.4% had children under the age of 18 living with them, 58.0% were married couples living together, 11.6% had a female householder with no husband present, and 25.9% were non-families. 20.5% of all households were made up of individuals, and 10.7% had someone living alone who was 65 years of age or older. The average household size was 2.68 and the average family size was 3.12.

In the CDP, the population was spread out, with 27.3% under the age of 18, 9.7% from 18 to 24, 28.0% from 25 to 44, 23.7% from 45 to 64, and 11.3% who were 65 years of age or older. The median age was 35 years. For every 100 females, there were 109.8 males. For every 100 females age 18 and over, there were 92.9 males.

The median income for a household in the CDP was $24,712, and the median income for a family was $34,583. Males had a median income of $18,333 versus $15,000 for females. The per capita income for the CDP was $12,643. About 1.5% of families and 0.9% of the population were below the poverty line, including 1.7% of those under the age of eighteen and none of those 65 or over.

References

Census-designated places in Delaware County, Oklahoma
Census-designated places in Oklahoma